Kvål or Kvalfeltet is a village in Ringsaker Municipality in Innlandet county, Norway. The village lies just north of the European route E6 highway.

References

Ringsaker
Villages in Innlandet